Close My Eyes is an album by The Slackers. It was released in 2003.

Artwork
Cover photo references 9/11 in both the mushroom cloud and the newspaper on the table. Interior photographs/design advisor: Denny Renshaw. Cover photo: Jess Paikarovski. Band photos: Lynee Geller. Layout/design: Eddie Ocampo.

Track listing
All songs written by Vic Ruggiero, except where noted. 
 "Shankbön" (Glen Pine) – 3:54
 "Old Dog"  (Dave Hillyard, Ruggiero) – 4:57
 "Axes"  – 3:33
 "Bin Waiting"  (Hillyard, Ruggerio) – 3:57
 "Real War"  (Marq Lyn, The Slackers) – 4:26
 "Lazy Woman"  (Marcus Geard, Ruggerio) – 3:28
 "Mommy"  – 3:01
 "Don't Wanna Go"  – 4:03
 "Who Knows"  – 4:26
 "Close My Eyes"  – 3:45
 "I'll Stay Away"  – 3:52
 "Decon Dub"  (Geard, Hillyard) – 4:28

References

2003 albums
The Slackers albums